The 2013 BGL Luxembourg Open was a women's tennis tournament played on indoor hard courts sponsored by BNP Paribas. It was the 18th edition of the BGL Luxembourg Open, and part of the WTA International tournaments of the 2013 WTA Tour. It was held in Kockelscheuer, Luxembourg from 14 October until 20 October 2013.

Singles main-draw entrants

Seeds

 Rankings are as of October 7, 2013

Other entrants
The following players received wildcards into the singles main draw:
  Timea Bacsinszky
  Mandy Minella
  Heather Watson

The following players received entry from the qualifying draw:
  Sesil Karatancheva
  Kristina Kučová
  Katarzyna Piter
  Tereza Smitková

Withdrawals
Before the tournament
  Sorana Cîrstea
  Julia Görges
  Madison Keys

Retirements
  Stefanie Vögele (left thigh injury)

Doubles main-draw entrants

Seeds

1 Rankings are as of October 7, 2013

Other entrants
The following pair received a wildcard into the doubles main draw:
  Mandy Minella /  Stefanie Vögele

Retirements
  Polona Hercog (right thoracic rib injury)

Finals

Singles

  Caroline Wozniacki defeated  Annika Beck, 6–2, 6–2

Doubles

  Stephanie Vogt /  Yanina Wickmayer defeated  Kristina Barrois /  Laura Thorpe, 7–6(7–2), 6–4

External links
 Official website
 WTA tournament draws

BGL Luxembourg Open
Luxembourg Open
2013 in Luxembourgian tennis